Fenghuang Airport may refer to:

 Sanya Phoenix International Airport, or Sanya Fenghuang Airport, in Sanya, Hainan, China
 Tongren Fenghuang Airport in Tongren, Guizhou, China